Darren Gilford (born 11 December 1982) is a Maltese former sprinter who specialized in the 100 metres.

Participating in the 2004 Summer Olympics, he achieved fifth place in his 100 metres heat, thus failing to make it through to the second round.

His personal best time is 10.54 seconds, achieved in May 2005 in Marsa. He was coached by Jivko Jetchev.

External links
 

1982 births
Living people
Maltese male sprinters
Athletes (track and field) at the 2004 Summer Olympics
Olympic athletes of Malta
World Athletics Championships athletes for Malta